Jonathan Micah Rosenberg (born December 30, 1951 in Chicago, Illinois) is an American mathematician, working in algebraic topology, operator algebras, K-theory and representation theory, with applications to string theory (especially dualities) in physics.

Rosenberg received his Ph.D. in 1976, under the supervision of Marc Rieffel, from the University of California, Berkeley (Group C*-algebras and square integrable representations). From 1977 to 1981 he was an assistant professor at the University of Pennsylvania. Since 1981, he has been at the University of Maryland at College Park where he is the Ruth M. Davis Professor of Mathematics. He is also a fellow of the American Mathematical Society (AMS).

He studies operator algebras and their relations with topology, geometry, with the unitary representation theory of Lie groups, K-theory and index theory. Along with H. Blaine Lawson and Mikhail Leonidovich Gromov, he is known for the Gromov–Lawson–Rosenberg conjecture.

Since 2015 he has been a managing editor of the Annals of K-Theory. During 2007-2015 he was an editor of the Journal of K-Theory.  Before that, he was an associate editor of the Journal of the AMS (2000-2003), and of the Proceedings of the AMS (1988-1992). He was a Sloan Fellow from 1981 to 1984.

Writings 
Algebraic K-Theory and its Applications, Graduate Texts in Mathematics, Springer Verlag 1996
With Kevin Coombes, Ronald Lipsman: Multivariable calculus and Mathematica: with applications to geometry and physics, Springer Verlag 1998
With Joachim Cuntz, Ralf Meyer: Topological and bivariant K-theory, Birkhauser 2007
Editor Robert Doran, Greg Friedman: Superstrings, geometry, topology and C * algebras, Proc. Symposia in Pure Mathematics, American Mathematical Society in 2010 (CBMS-NSF regional conference in Fort Worth 2009)
With Claude Schochet: The Künneth theorem and the universal coefficient theorem for equivariant K-theory and KK-theory, Memoirs American Mathematical Society 1988
With Claude Schochet: The Künneth theorem and the universal coefficient theorem for Kasparov's generalized K-functor. Duke Math J. 55 (1987), no 2, 431–474.
Editor Steven C. Ferry, Andrew Ranicki: Novikov Conjectures, Rigidity and Index Theorem, London Mathematical Society Lecture Notes Series 226, Cambridge University Press, 1995, 2 volumes (Oberwolfach Meeting 1993)
C*-algebras, positive scalar curvature, and the Novikov Conjecture, Part 1, Publ Math IHES, Volume 58, 1983, pp. 197–212, Part 2, in H. Araki, Eros, EC (ed.) Geometric Methods in Operator Algebras, Pitman Research Notes in Math 123 (1986), Longman / Wiley, pp. 341, part 3, Topology 25 (1986), 319
C* -algebras, positive scalar curvature, and the Novikov conjecture. Inst Hautes Etudes Sci. No Publ Math. 58 (1983), 197-212 (1984).
Editor with Sylvain Cappell, Andrew Ranicki: Surveys on Surgery Theory. Papers dedicated to CTC Wall, Princeton University Press, 2 vols, 2001
The KO-assembly map and positive scalar curvature, in S. Jackowski, B. Oliver, Pawalowski K. (ed.): Algebraic Topology (Poznan 1989), Lecture Notes in Math 1474 (1991), Springer-Verlag, Berlin, p 170
With S. Stolz: A "stable" version of the Gromov-Lawson criterium in Cenkl M., Miller, H. (ed.) The Cech centennial: Proc. Conference on Homotopy Theory, Contemporary Mathematics, 181, 1995, pp. 405–418
With Elliot Gootman: The structure of crossed product C * -algebras. A proof of the generalized Effros-Hahn conjecture. Invent. Math 52 (1979), no 3, 283–298.

See also
Twisted K-theory

References

External links 
 Homepage
 Biography

Living people
20th-century American mathematicians
21st-century American mathematicians
UC Berkeley College of Letters and Science alumni
University of Maryland, College Park faculty
Fellows of the American Mathematical Society
1951 births
People from Chicago
Mathematicians from Illinois
Topologists